The Cayman Islands competed at the 2018 Summer Youth Olympics, in Buenos Aires, Argentina from 6 to 18 October, 2018.

Competitors

Athletics

Swimming

References

2018 in Caymanian sport
Nations at the 2018 Summer Youth Olympics
Cayman Islands at the Youth Olympics